Edoardo Podberscek (2 May 1949) was an Italian hammer thrower, speciality in which was 7th at the 1978 European Athletics Championships.

Achievements

See also
 Italy at the 1978 European Athletics Championships
 Italy at the 1979 Mediterranean Games

References

External links
 

1949 births
Living people
Italian male hammer throwers
Sportspeople from Friuli-Venezia Giulia
Athletics competitors of Fiamme Gialle
Mediterranean Games silver medalists for Italy
Mediterranean Games medalists in athletics
Athletes (track and field) at the 1979 Mediterranean Games
Olympic athletes of Italy
Athletes (track and field) at the 1976 Summer Olympics